Shirley Childress Saxton (c.1947–2017) was an African-American sign language instructor and interpreter. She performed with Sweet Honey in the Rock from 1980–2017.

Biography

Early life and education
Shirley Childress was born and reared in Washington, D.C. to deaf parents, Herbert and Thomasina Childress, making American Sign Language her first language. She had two sisters, Maxine Childress Brown and Dr. Khaula Murtadha Watts. Saxton earned a bachelor's degree in Deaf Education from the University of Massachusetts Amherst and did graduate work at the University of the District of Columbia.

Career
She began her practice of interpreting for the deaf at Shiloh Baptist Church in Washington, D.C.. She was a certified interpreter and was a member of Registry of Interpreters for the Deaf. She taught introductory ASL classes and master workshops on interpreting music across the country. She joined Sweet Honey in the Rock in 1980.

Marriage and children
Shirley Childress was married to Pablo Saxton. She had two sons, Reginald and Deon.

Death
Shirley Childress died on 6 March 2017 at the age of 69 of complications from West Nile virus.

References

Notes
Washington City Paper link, Shirley Childress obituary

1947 births
2017 deaths
African-American educators
American educators
Interpreters
People from Washington, D.C.
University of Massachusetts Amherst College of Education alumni
University of the District of Columbia alumni
Sweet Honey in the Rock members
American Sign Language interpreters
20th-century translators
20th-century African-American people
21st-century African-American people